Hypothecla astyla is a butterfly in the family Lycaenidae first described by Cajetan Felder and Rudolf Felder in 1862. It is found on the Philippines.

Subspecies
H. a. astyla (Philippines: Luzon)
H. a. mindanaensis (Fruhstorfer, [1912]) (Philippines: Mindanao)
H. a. palawensis H. Hayashi, 1976 (Philippines: Palawan)
H. a. tegea Fruhstorfer, [1912] (Philippines: Bazilan)

References

D'Abrera, B. (1986). Butterflies of the Oriental Region, Part III Lycaenidae & Riodinidae: pp. 536–672. Melbourne.
Felder, C. & Felder, R. (1862). "Lepidoptera nova a Dre. Carolo Semper in insulis Philippinis collecta, Series secunda". Wiener Entomologische Monatschrift. 6 (9): 282–294.
Semper, G. (1886-1892). Die Schmetterlinge der Philippinischen Inseln, I. Tagfalter. 380 + 14 pp., 49 + 2 pls. Wiesbaden.
Treadaway, C. G. (1995). "Checklist of the butterflies of the Philippine Islands (Lepidoptera: Rhopalocera)" Nachrichten des Entomologischen Vereins Apollo. Suppl. 14: 7–118.

Treadaway, C. G. & Schrőder, Heinz (2012). "Revised checklist of the butterflies of the Philippine Islands (Lepidoptera: Rhopalocera)". Nachrichten des Entomologischen Vereins Apollo. Suppl. 20: 1-64.

External links

 With images.

Butterflies described in 1862
Theclinae